"History of a Boring Town" is a single by Less Than Jake. It is the seventh track on the band's third studio album Hello Rockview and was released as a single. The song reached number 39 on the Modern Rock Tracks.

References

Songs about cities
Less Than Jake songs
1999 singles
1998 songs
Song recordings produced by Howard Benson